Rhagium inquisitor, the ribbed pine borer, is a species of longhorn beetle in the family Cerambycidae. It was described by Carl Linnaeus in his landmark 1758 10th edition of Systema Naturae. It is distributed widely in the Holarctic, and its larvae burrow into the wood of larch, pine, spruce, birch and oak trees.

References

Lepturinae
Beetles described in 1758
Taxa named by Carl Linnaeus